Rural–urban commuting areas (RUCAs) categorize U.S. census tracts based on measures of urbanization, population density, and daily commuting. RUCA codes range from urban (1) to highly rural (10). RUCAs are a classification scheme that use the standard Census Bureau urban area definitions in combination with commuting information to characterize all of the nation's census tracts. Census tracts are used to establish RUCAs because they are the smallest geographic building block for which reliable commuting data are available.

RUCA codes are updated every year and may be found on the website of the Economic Research Service (ERS) of the United States Department of Agriculture and the University of Washington.

References

United States Census Bureau geography
United States Department of Agriculture
University of Washington